This is a list of every Sewanee Tigers football team quarterback and the years they participated on the Sewanee Tigers football team.

Main starting quarterbacks

1891 to 1944 (incomplete)

The following players were the predominant quarters for the Tigers following the birth of Sewanee Tigers football until the last time it played Vanderbilt.

1945 to present (incomplete)

References

Sewanee
Quarterbacks
Sewanee Tigers quarterbacks